The eighth season of the Case Closed anime was directed by Yasuichiro Yamamoto and produced by TMS Entertainment and Yomiuri Telecasting Corporation. The series is based on Gosho Aoyama's Case Closed manga series. In Japan, the series is titled  but was changed due to legal issues with the title Detective Conan. The episodes' plot follows Conan Edogawa's daily adventures.

The episodes use five pieces of theme music: two opening themes and three closing themes. The first opening theme is "Mysterious Eyes" by Garnet Crow until episode 204. The first ending theme is "Secret of My Heart" by Mai Kuraki until episode 204. The third ending theme is "Start in My Life" by Mai Kuraki and begins on episode 219.

The season initially ran from June 12, 2000 through January 8, 2001 on Nippon Television Network System in Japan. Episodes 194 to 219 were later collected into nine DVD compilations by Shogakukan. They were released between March 25, 2002 and September 25, 2002 in Japan.


Episode list

Notes

 One hour long special episode.
 Two hour long special episode.

References
General

Specific

2000 Japanese television seasons
2001 Japanese television seasons
Season 8